The 1949 Zandvoort Grand Prix was a non-championship Formula One race held on 31 July 1949 at Circuit Zandvoort.

Report 
The event consisted of two 25-lap heats and a 40-lap final. The cars were split based on their racing numbers, the lower numbers (1-9) competing in Heat 1 and the higher numbers (14-21) in Heat 2. A qualifying session determined the grid for each heat.

Giuseppe Farina secured pole position for Heat 1 at 1:54.8, the fastest time of the weekend. However, Luigi Villoresi beat him at the start and took the heat unchallenged, setting the fastest lap at 1:59.3. Farina could not challenge due to a misfire, but still finished second. Reigning race winner Prince Bira was third. St John Horsfall finished sixth but chose not to start the final due to a stiff piston.

Alberto Ascari secured pole position for Heat 2 at 1:55.0. Reg Parnell led the first lap but Ascari retook the lead and steadily pulled away. The race complexion changed in the middle phase: heavy rain began to fall, which better suited Parnell, and at the same time Ascari developed minor engine issues. Parnell closed a 23-second gap to Ascari and won the heat. Ascari set the fastest lap at 2:01. Geoffrey Crossley finished sixth; he handed his Alta over to George Abecassis for the final. Peter Whitehead retired with a broken magneto and Raymond Sommer suffered a broken throttle control.

The final was hotly contested between Ascari and Villoresi, the two Ferrari drivers trading the lead until lap 34 when a wheel fell off Ascari's car. Farina and Parnell had jumped the start and were handed a one minute post-race time penalty after respectively finishing second and fifth on the road.

Entries

Classification

Heat 1

Heat 2

Final

References

Zandvoort Grand Prix
Dutch Grand Prix
Zandvoort Grand Prix